Baileyoxylon is a genus of flowering plants belonging to the family Achariaceae.

Its native range is Queensland.

Species:

Baileyoxylon lanceolatum

References

Achariaceae
Malpighiales genera